Rowlands Gill railway station served the village of Rowlands Gill, Tyne and Wear, England from 1867 to 1963 on the Derwent Valley Railway.

History 
The station was opened on 2 December 1867 by the North Eastern Railway. It was situated on the south side of Station Road. The goods traffic was timber, bricks and coal to Newcastle and iron ore to Consett. Due to passenger numbers failing to recover after the Second World War, the station was closed on 1 February 1954 to passengers and closed completely along with the line on 11 November 1963.

The station master's house is the only remaining building from the station.

References

External links 

Disused railway stations in Tyne and Wear
Former North Eastern Railway (UK) stations
Railway stations in Great Britain opened in 1867
Railway stations in Great Britain closed in 1954
1867 establishments in England
1963 disestablishments in England
Rowlands Gill